Khoshk Dahaneh (also known as Khoshgeh Dahaneh, Khoshkeh Dahaneh, and Khūshkdāneh) is a village in the Virmuni Rural District, in the Central District of Astara County, Gilan Province, Iran. At the 2006 census, its population was 1,124, in 279 families.

Language 
Linguistic composition of the village.

References 

Populated places in Astara County

Azerbaijani settlements in Gilan Province

Talysh settlements in Gilan Province